The Punjab Food Authority (PFA) is an agency of the provincial Government of Punjab in Pakistan. It regulates food safety and hygiene in the Province. It was formed under the Punjab Food Authority Act 2011. The PFA is the first agency of its kind in Pakistan. Enforcement of food hygiene and quality standards as described in the Punjab Food Authority Act 2011 and the Pure Food Rules 2011.

The Punjab food Authority has been working as a functional entity in district Lahore since 2nd July 2012. Enforcement of food hygiene and quality standards as described in the Punjab Food Authority Act 2011 and the Pure Food Rules 2011 is carried out through a qualified team of Food Safety Officers (FSOs’) and Assistant Food Safety Officers (AFSOs’). The functionality of field teams at the district level is being supervised by the Deputy Director (Operations).

Mission Statement “While working on scientific principles and international best practices, Punjab Food Authority aims to ensure food safety & quality in the entire food chain in collaboration with manufacturers, Food Business Operators, consumers, government departments, autonomous bodies and other stakeholders.”

Vision Statement “The Punjab Food Authority aims to ensure safety and quality of all the food items and products.”

Responsibilities and Functions of PFA 

The Punjab Food Authority Act, 2011 entrusts the following functions and responsibilities to the Punjab Food Authority:
 Punjab Food Authority regulates and monitors the food business in order to ensure compliance by formers, manufacturers, distributors, importers and other stake holders in orders to provide safe food.
 Formulate standards, procedures, processes and guidelines in relation to any aspect of food including food business, food labeling, food additive, and specify appropriate enforcement systems.
 Enforcement of food safety and quality standards.
 Specify procedures and guidelines for setting up and up-gradation of food laboratories.
 Specify licensing, prohibition orders, recall procedures, improvement notices and prosecution in the court of law.
 Provides scientific advice and technical support to the Government in matters relating to food safety.
 Establishment of food laboratories.
 Organize training programmes in food safety and standards.
 Promote general awareness regarding food safety and standards.
 Certify food products/items for export.
 Forward and backward traceability of food items.
 Surveillance including collection, integration, analysis, interpretation and dissemination of data related to food and nutrient intakes.

References

External links
Punjab Food Authority

2011 establishments in Pakistan
Government agencies of Punjab, Pakistan
Government agencies established in 2011